Winny Brodt-Brown (born February 18, 1978) is an American former ice hockey player. She was the first winner of the Minnesota Ms. Hockey Award in 1996.
She won a silver medal at the 2000 and 2001 IIHF Women's World ice hockey championships.

She played for the Minnesota Whitecaps and was a member when the team won the Western Women's Hockey League championship during the 2008–09 season and the 2010 Clarkson Cup.  She was also a member of the Whitecaps when the team won the Isobel Cup during their first year as a member of the Premier Hockey Federation (then the National Women's Hockey League) during the 2018–19 season.

Playing career
In 1995–96, Brodt led Roseville High School to an undefeated season and the Minnesota state title. She registered 62 goals and 61 assists in 30 games. The following year, her NCAA eligibility required clarification due to half a credit for an English course. She participated with McGovern's club team in Minnesota. She accumulated 64 goals and 128 points while leading the team to the state title.

NCAA
Brodt joined the New Hampshire Wildcats women's ice hockey program in 1997 but only stayed one year. During the regular season, she accumulated 11 goals and 34 points in 39 games. In her one-year, she was part of the Wildcats team that won the AWCHA women's ice hockey championship. Brodt was recognized as the AWCHA tournament Most Valuable Player.

Brodt transferred from New Hampshire to the Minnesota Golden Gophers in 1998–99. She finished her Gophers career leading all defenders in points (134), goals (41) and assists (93).
In 1998–99, Brodt joined Minnesota and began the season on defense but moved to center in January. In 23 games, she registered 10 goals and 36 points. Her 31 assists were ninth in the NCAA, while her 45 points were tied for fifteenth overall. Her plus/minus rating (+52) led the team.  In addition, she had nine three-point games and 14 multiple-point games. In December, she played with the U.S. Women's Select Team at the Three Nations Cup.

The following season (1999–2000), she missed eleven games due to a fractured vertebra. Despite the time lost, her 50 points ranked second in the NCAA among defenders. On January 11, 2000, Brodt tied a Gophers record with five assists in one game as the Gophers bested Bemidji State by an 11–1 score. In a two-game series sweep of Dartmouth (February 11 and 12, 2000), she was part of eight of Minnesota's nine goals, with a goal and seven assists. In nine of the last twelve games, Brodt had multiple-point games (16 overall). In the AWCHA National Championship, Brodt scored a goal and four points.  It was her second national championship in three years.

After her junior season, she left the Gophers to play on the U.S. National Team. In 58 games with the National Team, Brodt scored 38 points.

During the 2002–03 Minnesota Golden Gophers season, Brodt returned to the Gophers for her senior year and was selected as an alternate captain. On that team, her sister Chelsey was a freshman.

Team USA
Her first exposure to USA Hockey came in 1995 with the US Junior Team and returned the following year in 1996. She was a participant at the USA Hockey Women's Festival in 1998, 1999, and 2000. She had several years experience with the United States national women's team. In addition, she was part of the Team USA squad that competed in the 1998 Three Nations Cup. She participated at the 2000 IIHF women's championships. The following year, in 2001 she participated in the World Championships also. She appeared in 5 games and registered 0 points.

Minnesota Whitecaps
Upon leaving the University of Minnesota, she joined the Western Women's Hockey League (WWHL) Minnesota Whitecaps in their inaugural 2004–05 season. In 2006, she was joined by her sister Chelsey Brodt-Rosenthal. They played every season with the Whitecaps, including their 2010 Clarkson Cup win, and through the team's independent years after the dissolution of the WWHL in 2011. Both signed contracts with the Whitecaps for its inaugural 2018–19 season in the professional Premier Hockey Federation (PHF, originally the National Women's Hockey League). She announced her retirement from the Whitecaps on August 16, 2022.

Career stats

Regular season and playoffs

International

Awards and honors
Ms. Hockey Award: 1996
Top 3 finalists for Minnesota Sports Channel 1996 Athlete of the Year award
Most valuable player: 1998 AWCHA Championship
WCHA Defensive Player of the Year: 1999–2000
Top 10 finalist for the Patty Kazmaier Award: 1999–2000
1998 AWCHA Tournament Most Outstanding player
 1999 Patty Berg Academic Award winner
2000 AWCHA All-Tournament Team
2000 WCHA Defensive Player of the Year
First-team All-WCHA (2000)
WCHA All-Academic Team member (2000)
WCHA All-Tournament pick  (2000)
Peggy MacInnis Bye Scholarship award winner  (2000)
Academic All-Big Ten (2000)
Patty Berg Academic Award honoree (2000)
Western Women's Hockey League Defensive Player of the Year, 2006–07

Group affiliations
Herb Brooks Foundation Board Member (2008–2009)
OS Hockey Training Director (2003–present)

Personal
A 1996 graduate of Roseville Area High School. Her brother Vic Brodt played hockey at St. Cloud State. Her cousin, Craig Selander, was a three-year letterwinner with the Gopher baseball team and played professionally with the Minnesota Twins. Brodt is employed at Proguard Sports, a hockey accessory company, as an internal sales rep. She also started her own hockey company, OS (Overspeed) Hockey. She is married to Justin Brown. She is also an instructor for the Highland Central Hockey Association in St. Paul, Minnesota.

References

External links

U.S. Olympic Team bio

1978 births
Living people
American women's ice hockey defensemen
Clarkson Cup champions
Ice hockey players from Minnesota
Minnesota Golden Gophers women's ice hockey players
Minnesota Ms. Hockey Award winners
Minnesota Whitecaps players
New Hampshire Wildcats women's ice hockey players
People from Roseville, Minnesota
Isobel Cup champions
Premier Hockey Federation players